Georgios Daispangos (1910 –27 July 1987) was a Greek footballer who played as a defender for AEK Athens in the 1930's. Throughout different periods of the 1940's, 1950's and 1960's, he served as the manager of the first team and all the departments of the academies of AEK. He was one of the pioneers of Greek football and one of the "Patriarchs" of the club. There were no limits of the service of Daispangos to AEK Athens.

Club career

Early years
Daispangos was born in 1910 in Piraeus and fate brought him at the age of 14 to Neo Faliro as a footballer of Asteras Piraeus, to watch a newly founded team with origins from Constantinople, AEK Athens. The 14-year-old Daispangos was "enchanted" from the technical football AEK were playing at the time and set a goal to one day wear the yellow-black jersey and become a teammate with the players that looked like heroes, in his childish eyes. His admiration for AEK was proverbial and as he narrated, in 1927 at the age of 17, he ran away from his home in Piraeus, to follow ΑΕΚ on a trip to Chelidonou in Kifissia. It was Clean Monday and Daispangos lied to his mother that he was going to the tailor shop, only to follow the team that he loved from Piraeus to Helidonou, a distance that in those years was very long, as Kifissia was considered countryside for the Athenians, furthermore to people from Piraeus, like Daispangos.

AEK Athens
He was invited to AEK in 1929 by the then coach, Josef Sveg and played for the club for 6 consecutive years next to the legends of the club, such as Kostas Negrepontis, Stavros Emmanouilidis, Robert Mallios Galić and Themos Asderis. Ιn 1932 AEK won their first ever trophy, the Greek cup, against Aris at Leoforos Alexandras Stadium, with Daispangos being one of the protagonists of the final alongside Giamalis, Negrepontis and the two-time scorer, Baltas. In parallel with football, he worked in his family tailor shop in Piraeus and in fact, was a gifted craftsman as a tailor, until 1928, as he was invited through AEK to work at ULEN (the later EYDAP) in order to have more free time to devote to football. Simultaneously with his job at ULEN, Daispangos also worked at AEK, helping wherever he was asked to. He served from caretaker to masseur and clothing manager. He said that he was very happy at that period in AEK, as he considered it the time that he bonded to the club, since he saw something big was being made in his hands. He retired as a footballer at the age of only 25.

Later career
Daispangos experienced the golden age for the club, before the Occupation destroyed everything, including AEK Athens. He was the man who collected the belongings of AEK and kept the club's property in the small room in his house in Piraeus, before they moved to the house of Rangavis in Kapnikarea square. He lost touch with AEK during that period, but he kept on playing football, coaching Koukouvaounes, until end of the WW2 and the release of Greece, where AEK invited him back to the club. He undertook the task to reorganize the club's famous academies from the beginning, since Daispangos was also a pioneer for the club and in 1934 had created an amazing youth team from which huge figures of its history emerged, such as Kleanthis Maropoulos, Michalis Delavinias and Tryfon Tzanetis.

Simultaneously to his return and the organization of the team's academies, Daispangos practically acted as the coach of all teams and club's divisions. In 1948 when Jack Beby arrived in Athens, to coach AEK, he received an enviable and young team from Daispangos with already international footballers, such as Emmanouilidis, Darakis, Papatheodorou and Poulis. All the huge figures in the later history of AEK were products of Daispangos' work. On his side throughout his career were the then curator, Nikos Goumas and the Vice President of AEK, Konstantinos Skouras, father-in-law of Sokratis Kokkalis, the later President of Olympiacos Piraeus. During 1948 the first rupture between him and AEK, was made. He was fired and ended up at AO Kifissias and also worked at Daphni Athens, before Apollon Athens called him to coach the club in 1951.

Two years later, his old love, AEK, called him again. Once more he undertook all the divisions of the club, with special emphasis on the departments of the academies, but left once more, in 1955. He wandered for 6 years in Chalandri, Athinaikos, Atromitos Athens, Argos and back in Atromitos, in 1960. A year later, in 1961, at AEK, Goumas and Skouras have returned to the club's administration and Daispangos rejected the proposals of PAOK and Aris, as he was called to return to AEK. Daispangos came back to AEK on the condition that he will work together with Tzanetis and asks Nikos Goumas to take over the academies, that he considered them the weakness of the club and the then President of AEK, did not hesitate to assign him in charge of all departments.

The work of Daispangos on AEK Athens' academies speaks for itself. In his first spell for AEK from 1945 to 1949 he promoted players such as Poulis, Emmanouilidis, Parayios, Papatheodorou, Oikonomou, Sevastiadis and Darakis. All of them international at their departments. In his second spell from 1953 and 1955, he produced Vernezis, Melissis, Alafogiannis, Adamantidis and the Argyropoulos brothers. In his third and final term at the academies of AEK he brought out footballers, such as Karafeskos, Stathopoulos, Simigdalas, Sevastopoulos, Pomonis, Kagianas, Andrikoulas, Kritikos, Lavaridis, Maniateas, Karapoulitidis, Sarris, Kyrmizas, Karakidis, Stefanou, Thivaios, Triantafyllou, Liakouris, Istorios, Psychogyios, Theodoridis, Moschakis, Papaioannou, Giannopoulos, Karoulias, the Karypidis brothers, Papagiannis and Kontopoulos, from 1963 to 1971.

In his 19-year presence on its infrastructure departments, AEK wοn 18 titles in total: 
Undefeated champions of Athens and FCA Golden Medal with the Youth team in 1946–47
Undefeated champions of Athens with the Youth team in 1948–49
Champions of Athens with the Reserve team and undefeated champions with the Youth team in 1953–54
Champions of the South Group in the championship and Undefeated champions of Greece with the Youth team in 1963–64
Champions of the South Group in the championship and Undefeated champions of Greece with the Youth team in 1964–65 
Champions of the South Group in the championship and champions of Greece with the Reserve team in 1964–65
Champions of the South Group in the championship and Undefeated champions of Greece with the Reserve team in 1965–66
Champions of the South Group in the championship and Undefeated champions of Greece with the Reserve team in 1966–67 and 1967–68. 
The architect of all that success, was him.

Daispangos was one of the founding members of the Hellenic Coaches Association, which served for more than a decade as its General Secretary. He had also been in the first team coach of AEK Athens occasionally, after the 40's and the 50's. In 1967 at Skopje against Vardar and in Constanța against Farul because the coach of the first team, Jenő Csaknády could not enter the Eastern states. AEK left undefeated from both games with 2 draws. The last time he sat on the bench of AEK, at the end of 1967 in Ljubljana, where AEK faced Olimpija in a 3–3 draw, although they finished the match with 9 players. In 1971, Daispangos retired from football after a 42-year presence on and off the fields. He also had a son who played for AEK for 2 seasons, until 1962.

Honours

AEK Athens
Greek Cup: 1931–32

References

1910 births
1987 deaths
Greek football managers
AEK Athens F.C. players
AEK Athens F.C. managers
Apollon Smyrnis F.C. managers
Footballers from Piraeus
Association football defenders
AEK Athens F.C. non-playing staff
Greek footballers